"Everybody Needs a Hero" is a song recorded by American country music artist Gene Watson.  It was released in August 1987 as the second single from the album Honky Tonk Crazy.  The song reached #28 on the Billboard Hot Country Singles & Tracks chart.  The song was written by Troy Seals and Max D. Barnes. 

The song was later covered by The Marcy Brothers for their self-titled 1991 Atlantic album.

Chart performance

References

1987 singles
1987 songs
Gene Watson songs
Songs written by Max D. Barnes
Songs written by Troy Seals
Epic Records singles